Southern Coral Group is a collective term for two islands of Outer Islands of the Seychelles, lying in the south of the island nation, between 135 and 300 kilometers south of the capital, Victoria, on Mahé Island.

Islands
Two widely separated islands, with a distance of 171 km from one another, make up the Southern Coral Group. They are both sand cays, situated on the northeastern sides of pseudo-atolls:
Île Platte in the north
Coëtivy Island in the southeast

Population
Both islands are inhabited. The main settlement is on Coëtivy Island.

References

External links 

 Island guide 1
 Island guide 2
 National Bureau of Statistics
 Info on the island

Outer Islands (Seychelles)
Archipelagoes of Seychelles